Michael Urukalo, born Milorad Urukalo, is a Serbian-born Australian football (soccer) coach who has worked at several clubs in Africa, Asia and Australia.

Urukalo coached in Malaysia, Singapore Pro League, Kuwait National League and Guam Football Federation. He was also the first coach to achieve the Malaysian Double, winning both the Malaysian League and Malaysia Cup in 1991 with Johor.

He also had a brief stint with Enyimba of Nigeria, with whom he won the 2004 African Super Cup.

References

External links
Urukalo 'loses' Enyimba job (BBC Sport, 5 August 2004)
Urukalo Keen To Return To Malaysian Scene
Stats at Ozfootball.com

Living people
Serbian emigrants to Australia
Serbian football managers
Serbian expatriate football managers
Expatriate football managers in Nigeria
Enyimba F.C. managers
Sydney Olympic FC managers
Expatriate football managers in Cyprus
Nea Salamis Famagusta FC managers
Year of birth missing (living people)
Australian people of Serbian descent